Arsenal (also alternative title January Uprising in Kyiv in 1918) is a 1929 Soviet war film by Ukrainian director Oleksandr Dovzhenko. The film was shot at Odessa Film Factory of VUFKU  with the camera of cameraman Danyl Demutskyi and using the original sets made by Volodymyr Muller. The expressionist imagery, camera work and original drama were said to take the film far beyond the usual propaganda and made it one of the most important pieces of Ukrainian avant-garde cinema. The film was made in 1928 and released early in 1929. It is the second film in his "Ukraine Trilogy", the first being Zvenigora (1928) and the third being Earth (1930).

The film concerns an episode in the Russian Civil War in 1918 in which the Kiev Arsenal January Uprising of workers aided the besieging Bolshevik army against the Ukrainian national Parliament Central Rada who held legal power in Ukraine at the time. Regarded by film scholar Vance Kepley, Jr. as "one of the few Soviet political films which seems even to cast doubt on the morality of violent retribution", Dovzhenko's eye for wartime absurdities (for example, an attack on an empty trench) anticipates later pacifist sentiments in films by Jean Renoir and Stanley Kubrick.

Plot 
From the last months of World War I and the derailment of the demobilization train the story moves to the Arsenal armory in Kiev, where the Bolshevik Timosh, who has returned from the front, is the central figure. The January uprising of workers in Kiev, their confrontation with gangs of haidamaks serving the bourgeois Rada of the Ukrainian People's Republic, and the cruelest massacre of the rebels.

Cast
Semyon Svashenko — Timosha
Georgiy Kharkiv — Red Army
Amvrosy Buchma — German soldier in glasses
Dmitri Erdman — a German officer
Sergey Petrov — a German soldier
K. Mikhailovsky — nationalist
Alexander Evdakov — Nicholas II
Andrei Mikhailovsky — nationalist

References

External links
 Arsenal (full version), Odessa Film Studios

Ray Uzwyshyn's Visual Exploration of Arsenal

1920s Russian-language films
1920s war drama films
Soviet black-and-white films
Films directed by Alexander Dovzhenko
Films set in Ukraine
Films set in Kyiv
Odesa Film Studio films
Russian Civil War films
Soviet silent feature films
Soviet-era Ukrainian films
Soviet war drama films
All-Ukrainian Photo Cinema Administration films
Ukrainian war drama films
Ukrainian black-and-white films
Silent war drama films
Soviet epic films